"Stay Forever" is a song co-written and recorded by American country music artist Hal Ketchum.  It was released in January 1995 as the third single from his album Every Little Word.  The song reached number 8 on the Billboard Hot Country Singles & Tracks chart in May 1995.  It was written by Ketchum and Benmont Tench.

Critical reception
Larry Flick, of Billboard magazine reviewed the song unfavorably, saying that Ketchum does his "vocal best" to rescue the ballad. He goes on to call it a "not-so-special song."

Music video
The music video was directed by Jim Shea and premiered in early 1995.

Chart performance
"Stay Forever" debuted at number 69 on the U.S. Billboard Hot Country Singles & Tracks for the week of February 11, 1995.

Year-end charts

References

1995 singles
1994 songs
Hal Ketchum songs
Songs written by Benmont Tench
Songs written by Hal Ketchum
Song recordings produced by Allen Reynolds
Curb Records singles